Vijayawada railway division (formerly: Bezawada railway division) is one of the three railway divisions under South Coast Railways of the Indian Railways. The headquarters of the division are located at Vijayawada.

History 

It was formed as one of the eight divisions in Southern Railway on 16 May 1956. After the formation of South Central Railway zone, the division was integrated into it on 2 October 1966.

On 27 February 2019, This division was announced to be integrated with South Coast Railway zone with Visakhapatnam as its headquarters.

Administration and jurisdiction 

The division is located completely in the state of Andhra Pradesh. The present Divisional Railway Manager is P.Srinivass.

Sections and branch lines 

The Gudur–Duvvada (Vijayawada–Gudur(tripling under progress) and Vijayawada-Duvvada), Vijayawada–Kondapalli, Samalkot–Kakinada Port, Vijayawada-Bhimavaram-Nidadavolu, Bhimavaram–Narasapuram and Gudivada-Machilipatnam are electrified and double-track railway lines. Kondapalli railway station is the divisional interchange station.

The lines and sections under the jurisdiction of the Vijayawada division are listed below:

Under construction:
- railway line
 Tripling of Double Electric Line from Kondapalle - Gudur

Source:
Vijayawada Division System map
Jurisdiction

Note:
excl.– Station excluded / not under the divisional jurisdiction
km– Kilometer measure of distance between two lines
Vijayawada–Gudivada section (42.69 km) is covered in Vijayawada–Nidadavolu loop line. Duvvada–Gudur section covers, both Duvvada–Vijayawada section and Vijayawada–Gudur sections)

Stations categories 

The revised station categorization is based on footfalls at the station and it includes three groups namely, Non-Suburban (NS), Suburban (S) and Halt (H). It is further divided into grades ranging from 1-6 for Non-Suburban, 1-3 for Suburban and 1-3 for Halt stations. , there are a total of 161 stations in the division. Out of these, 108 are categorized as Non-suburban, 48 as Halt stations. Five stations namely, Nidiguntapalem, Krishnapatnam, Sarpavaram, Komarapudi does not handle any coaching traffic and six halt stations namely, Kaikoram, Kesavaram, Pedabrahmadevam,  were closed.

Source: Stations – Category-wise (NEW)

Performance and earnings 

The division operates around 274 passenger and 150 freight trains every day. There are a total of 222 electric, 34 diesel locos, 838 coaches, 29 MEMU, 37 DEMU's. Vijayawada railway division generates much of its revenue from freight transport, which includes major commodities like coal, fertilisers, food grains, cement etc. Krishnapatnam and Kakinada Ports are the two main revenue earners for the division in freight transport. During 2013–14, it handled a divisional record of  passengers. In the financial year 2018–19, the gross earnings of the division were a whooping . In the same fiscal year, it recorded as the only division with 9.3 metric tonnes of freight loading in the country.

The below table shows the revenue and serving traffic of both passenger and freight from 2017–18 financial year.

Awards and achievements 

The office of the Vijayawada Divisional Regional Manager was awarded the certified by the National Energy Conservation Award (NECA)-2013 based on the steps taken on energy efficiency. It also won 19 of 58 shields based on its performance in 2013.
During the 64th Railway week, the division was awarded General Manager's Efficiency and 11 other awards.
Vijayawada railway station was awarded Green Railway Stations Certificate by Indian Green Building Council (IGBC), which secured 71 points out of 100.

References

See also 
Divisions of Indian Railways
Guntur railway division

 
1966 establishments in Andhra Pradesh
Divisions of Indian Railways